| tries = {{#expr:
 + 6 + 3 + 9 + 4 + 6 + 9 + 2
 + 6 + 5 + 5 + 4 + 10 + 5 + 6
 + 3 + 4 + 4 + 6 + 3 + 13 + 3
 + 7 + 1 + 6 + 11 + 4 + 8 + 5
 + 9 + 6 + 4 + 9 + 6 + 5 + 5
 + 10 + 6 + 3 + 5 + 3 + 4 + 2
 + 6 + 8 + 3 + 4 + 4 + 4 + 6 
 + 7 + 7 + 3 + 12 + 5 + 6 + 4
 + 6 + 3 + 7 + 9 + 7 + 8 + 8
 + 9 + 7 + 10 + 3 + 6 + 7 + 5
 + 5 + 4 + 8 + 5 + 8 + 2 + 9 
 + 3 + 1 + 3 + 3 + 4 + 7 + 9 
 + 8 + 6 + 6 + 7 + 9 + 7 + 6
 + 9
 + 9
 + 4 + 4 + 9 + 10 + 5 + 6 + 6
 + 4 + 7 + 6 + 3 + 4 + 5 + 5
 + 3 + 6 + 11 + 6 + 7 + 5 + 2
 + 8 + 5 
 + 2 + 7 + 2
 + 6 + 6 + 11 + 10 + 5 + 4 + 6
 + 6 + 6 + 7 + 4 + 7 + 7 + 9
 + 3 + 7 + 1 + 9 + 10 + 9 + 5
 + 8 + 6
 + 6 + 3 + 8 + 6 + 6 + 5 + 4
 + 3 + 7
 + 6 + 3

}}
| highest attendance = 62,338 – Judgement Day(28 April 2018)
| lowest attendance = 
| top point scorer = 
| top try scorer = 
| website = www.pro14rugby.org
| prevseason = 2016–17 Pro12
| nextseason = 2018–19
}}

The 2017–18 PRO14 (also known as the Guinness PRO14 for sponsorship reasons) was the seventeenth season of the professional rugby union competition originally known as the Celtic League. It is the first season to be referred to as the Guinness PRO14 Championship, with the addition of two South African teams.

Fourteen teams competed in this season — four Irish teams: Connacht, Leinster, Munster and Ulster; two Italian teams: Benetton and Zebre; two Scottish teams: Edinburgh and Glasgow Warriors; two South African teams: Cheetahs and the Southern Kings; and four Welsh teams: Cardiff Blues, Dragons, Ospreys and Scarlets.

Scarlets came into the new season as defending champions, and for the second season reached the PRO14 final. Leinster, however, won the final at the Aviva Stadium to take their fifth title in the competition's various iterations, and seal a domestic league and European Cup double, only the sixth team to do so, and the first from the PRO14 Championship.

Teams

Changes for the season

 On 18 May 2017, European Professional Club Rugby announced key changes to how PRO14 teams qualify for the European Rugby Champions Cup. At the end of the 2017–18 season, the top seven eligible teams qualified for the 2018–19 European Rugby Champions Cup, regardless of their country of origin (previously the seven qualifiers included at least one team from each of Ireland, Italy, Scotland and Wales). The two South African teams are not eligible to qualify for EPCR tournaments.
 On 30 June 2017, BBC Wales reported that the two South African teams being dropped from the Super Rugby competition, the Cheetahs and Southern Kings, would be immediately added to Pro12. The two teams, the South African Rugby Union and Pro12 organiser Celtic Rugby Limited refused to comment on the report. However, their involvement was confirmed on 1 August 2017.

Format

 League Stage

The fourteen teams will be split into two conferences of seven teams, with each conference featuring two teams from Ireland and Wales plus one team from Italy, Scotland and South Africa. The regular season will be made up of 21 rounds –
12 home and away games against each team in their own conference
7 games, either home or away, against the teams in the other conference
2 additional regional derbies –
Each Irish team will play the two Irish teams in the other conference, one at home and one away
Each Welsh team will play the two Welsh teams in the other conference, one at home and one away
Each Italian team will play the Italian team in the other conference twice, home and away
Each Scottish team will play the Scottish team in the other conference twice, home and away
Each South African team will play the South African team in the other conference twice, home and away

 League Play-Offs

The first-placed team in each conference are given a bye to the semi-finals with the second and third placed teams in each conference meeting in two quarter-finals for the two remaining semi-final places. This is the first year in which there will be two quarter-finals prior to the semi-finals and final.

 Qualification For Champions Cup

The South African teams cannot compete in the European Rugby Champions Cup. The top three eligible teams in each conference automatically qualified for following year's Champions Cup. The fourth ranked eligible team in each conference met in a play-off match with the winner taking the seventh Champions Cup place.

Team Changes

Ireland
In February 2017, Connacht announced that New Zealander Kieran Keane, Chiefs attack coach, had signed a three-year contract to become their new head coach, replacing Pat Lam who moved to Bristol. Following Keane's appointment, existing forwards coach Jimmy Duffy signed an extension to his deal and academy manager Nigel Carolan was promoted to backs coach, leaving his post as head coach of the Ireland under-20s to take the role. In May 2017, Peter Wilkins joined from Edinburgh as defence coach.

In March 2017, Leinster confirmed that all four of their current coaches had extended their terms with the province. Head coach Leo Cullen, senior coach Stuart Lancaster, backs coach Girvan Dempsey and scrum coach John Fogarty signed contracts to take them through to summer 2019.

In June 2017, after many weeks of media speculation, Munster confirmed that director of rugby Rassie Erasmus and defence coach Jacques Nienaber would leave their roles with the province and return to South Africa on 31 December 2017, to take over the national team. In the same month coaches Jerry Flannery and Felix Jones extended their contracts with the province by two years, expanding their roles to forwards coach, and backline and attack coach respectively. Team manager Niall O'Donovan also signed a new three-year contract. Johann van Graan, the Springboks forwards coach, was named as the new head coach in September 2017, and started his appointment ahead of Round 9 of the tournament.

In February 2017, Ulster announced that New Zealander Jono Gibbes, former Leinster and then-Clermont Auvergne forwards coach, would be joining the province as their new head coach on a two-year contract working under existing director of rugby Les Kiss. It was also announced that former Wales and Lions scrum-half Dwayne Peel had joined as an assistant coach. In June 2017, Ulster added former Leinster hooker and Grenoble coach Aaron Dundon as their Scrum Coach. Kiss left his post on 31 January 2018 by mutual agreement with the province, with Gibbes assuming all coaching responsibility of the team for the remainder of the season.

Italy
Ahead of the new season, Benetton Treviso changed their name, becoming just Benetton. In July 2017, New Zealand-born flanker Dean Budd was named as team captain replacing Alessandro Zanni.

In July 2017, Zebre announced that a new company had been formed, named Zebre Rugby Club, to take the second Italian place in the Pro14 ahead of the 2017–18 season. This followed an earlier announcement from the Italian Rugby Federation that Zebre intended to withdraw from the league due to major financial complications. However, with the formation of the new company, the club will now remain in Parma. Former Connacht and Edinburgh coach Michael Bradley was appointed as Zebre's new head coach. In addition to the change of coach, Zebre saw a change to the captaincy with Tommaso Castello serving as co-captain with the previous season's skipper George Biagi.

Scotland
In February 2017, Edinburgh announced that former Leicester Tigers coach Richard Cockerill would be taking over as their new director of rugby from the start of the season. Then acting head coach Duncan Hodge returned to his usual role of Backs Coach. Magnus Bradbury was named as the new team captain at the start of the season, replacing the joint captains from the previous season, Grant Gilchrist and Stuart McInally. Bradbury was stripped of his captaincy in October 2017 due to off-field discipline issues, and replaced in the role by Fraser McKenzie.

In August 2016, Glasgow Warriors announced that Dave Rennie, then coach of Super Rugby side Chiefs, would replace Gregor Townsend as head coach from the beginning of the 2017–18 season. This followed the news that Townsend was leaving the club to become the Scottish national team's new head coach. Scottish international Ryan Wilson was announced as the side's new captain in August 2017, replacing Jonny Gray and Henry Pyrgos.

South Africa
On 1 August 2017, it was announced that the Cheetahs and the Southern Kings would join the Pro12, forming the Pro14. They join following their removal from the Southern Hemisphere Super Rugby competition.

Cheetahs' coaching structure was altered following the move north, with Rory Duncan becoming the team's head coach and Franco Smith taking on the role of director of rugby. During the 2017 Super Rugby season the roles had been reversed. The move will see Duncan take charge of the first team, with Smith focusing on development of junior players and coaches, which will allow him to remain involved with South Africa at international level. The Cheetahs are captained by Niell Jordaan.

Southern Kings preparation for the season was disrupted by the loss of a number of players prior to the confirmation of the side's admission to the competition. Among the players lost was regular captain Lionel Cronje. To fill out the squad, a number of players were signed on loan deals from South African Super Rugby sides. On 28 August, head coach Deon Davids appointed hooker Mike Willemse as the team's captain for their first ever tour in the competition.

Wales
In August 2017, Cardiff Blues added former players Nicky Robinson and Richie Rees to their backroom staff. They join as kicking coach and backs coach respectively.

On 20 June 2017, it was announced that, following a vote in March 2017 to allow the takeover of the club and Rodney Parade by the Welsh Rugby Union, Newport Gwent Dragons would be dropping "Newport Gwent" from its name and would be known simply as Dragons with immediate effect. A new crest was also unveiled. This followed the replacement of Kingsley Jones as head coach with Bernard Jackman earlier in the month. In August 2017, South African Hendré Marnitz, then head coach of Currie Cup side Blue Bulls, was confirmed as the Dragons' defence coach for the upcoming season. In the same month, Barry Maddocks was appointed as the Dragons' skills coach.

Ospreys came into the season with Steve Tandy as head coach. Tandy was sacked in January 2018, following a poor run of results in the league and in Europe. The team's forwards coach, former Ulster and Ireland player Allen Clarke, was named as his replacement on an interim basis for the remainder of the season.

Champions Scarlets came into the season largely unchanged. Fellow Lion, Leigh Halfpenny was signed from Toulon as a replacement.

Table

Match summary

Conference stage
All times are local.

Round 1

Round 2

Round 3

Round 4

Round 5

Round 6

Round 7

Round 8

Round 9

Round 10

Round 11

1872 Cup 1st round

Round 12

1872 Cup 2nd round

Round 13

South African derbies

These are round 11 and round 12 matches which are scheduled after the normal round dates.

Round 14

Round 15

Round 16

Round 17
All games scheduled to be held in the United Kingdom and Italy were postponed over 28 February and 1 March due to a cold weather wave resulting in sub-zero temperatures, and potential inability for air travel. The Scarlets–Leinster match was moved to the following weekend, being played on 9 March, whilst the Edinburgh–Munster and Cardiff Blues–Benetton games were rescheduled to the 16 March. The Ulster–Glasgow Warriors game was moved to the weekend of 20/21/22 April, whilst the Zebre–Ospreys game was postponed to a yet to be determined date.

Round 17 rescheduled matches

 Match rescheduled from 3 March 2018.

 Match rescheduled from 2 March 2018.

 Match rescheduled from 2 March 2018.

Round 18

Round 19

Round 20

Round 17 rescheduled match

 Match rescheduled from 3 March 2018.

 Match rescheduled from 2 March 2018.

Round 21

Judgement Day

1872 Cup 3rd round

Play-offs

The top side from each of the two conferences are given a bye to the semi-finals and have home advantage. Teams placed second and third in opposite conferences play each other to determine the other two semi-finalists with the team ranked second having home advantage.

The play-offs are scheduled in the four weeks after the regular season has been completed.

Quarter-finals

Semi-finals

Final

Play-off for the 7th Champions Cup place

The South African teams cannot compete in the European Rugby Champions Cup. The top three eligible teams in each conference automatically qualify for following year's Champions Cup. The fourth ranked eligible team in each conference meet in a play-off match with the winner taking the seventh Champions Cup place.

Ulster had home advantage against Ospreys by virtue of finishing with the greater number of points accumulated during the PRO14 regular league (62, as opposed to Ospreys’ 44). The match was played on Sunday 20 May, at the Kingspan Stadium.

Referees
On 30 August, a 13-man referee elite squad was announced by Elite Referee Manager Greg Garner (number of matches refereed):

  Mike Adamson (SRU) – (8)
  Stuart Berry (SARU) – (0)
  Andrew Brace (IRFU) – (23)
  George Clancy (IRFU) – (89)
  Ian Davies (WRU) – (64)
  Quinton Immelman (SARU) – (0)
  Dan Jones (WRU) – (8)
  John Lacey (IRFU) – (63)
  Marius Mitrea (FIR) – (68)
  Frank Murphy (IRFU) – (5)
  Nigel Owens (WRU) – (152)
  Ben Whitehouse (WRU) – (33)
  David Wilkinson (IRFU) – (51)

Note: Additional referees are used throughout the season, selected from a select development squad.

Attendances by club
 Includes quarter-finals and semi-finals – the final is not included as it is held at a neutral venue.  Due to the league structure of the Pro 14, some teams only played 10 league home games during the league stage, while others played 11.  Does not include European Champions Cup play-off game.

End of Season Awards

PRO14 Dream Team

Note: Flags to the left of player names indicate national team as has been defined under World Rugby eligibility rules, or primary nationality for players who have not yet earned international senior caps. Players may hold one or more non-WR nationalities.

Award winners

Leading scorers

Top points scorers

Top try scorers

Notes

References

External links
 

 
2017–18 in European rugby union leagues
2017-18
2017–18 in Irish rugby union
2017–18 in Italian rugby union
2017–18 in Scottish rugby union
2017–18 in Welsh rugby union
2017 in South African rugby union
2018 in South African rugby union